Sorhagenia nimbosus, the midrib gall moth, is a moth in the family Cosmopterigidae. It was described by Annette Frances Braun in 1915. It is found in North America, where it has been recorded from British Columbia, Washington and California.

Adults have been recorded on wing from March to October.

The larvae feed on the leaves of Frangula species. The feeding induces gall formation, as a result, the middle of the leaves crinkles upward causing the sides of the leaf to meet.

References

Moths described in 1915
Chrysopeleiinae